These are the official results of the Men's 800 metres event at the 1986 European Championships in Stuttgart, West Germany, held at Neckarstadion on 26, 27, and 28 August 1986.

Medalists

Results

Final
28 August

Semi-finals
27 August

Semi-final 1

Semi-final 2

Heats
26 August

Heat 1

Heat 2

Heat 3

Heat 4

Participation
According to an unofficial count, 27 athletes from 19 countries participated in the event.

 (1)
 (1)
 (1)
 (1)
 (1)
 (1)
 (1)
 (2)
 (1)
 (1)
 (1)
 (3)
 (1)
 (2)
 (1)
 (1)
 (3)
 (3)
 (1)

See also
 1984 Men's Olympic 800 metres (Los Angeles)
 1987 Men's World Championships 800 metres (Rome)
 1988 Men's Olympic 800 metres (Seoul)

References

 Results

800
800 metres at the European Athletics Championships